WECO (940 AM, "Solid Gospel") is a radio station broadcasting a Christian radio format. Licensed to Wartburg, Tennessee, United States, the station is currently owned by Morgan County Broadcasting Company, Inc. and features programming from Citadel Media, Motor Racing Network and Salem Radio Network.

References

External links
 

Gospel radio stations in the United States
Radio stations established in 1975
Southern Gospel radio stations in the United States
ECO